The Setun is a river in the west of Moscow and the largest tributary of the Moskva in Moscow. The Setun originates in the village of Salariyevo in Moscow Oblast and flows into the Moskva near Krasnoluzhsky Road Bridge, opposite to the former village of Luzhniki. The river teems with roach, European perch, crucian carp, pike, and other fish, but is of no value to the fishing industry due to pollution with toxic waste.

The border territory upon both banks is included in Setun River's Valley wildlife sanctuary, placed in the Moscow city bounds.

Image gallery

References

Rivers of Moscow Oblast
Rivers of Moscow